Macrohon Institute, Incorporated or known simply as MACI, is a private, non-sectarian, secondary institution located in the Municipality of Macrohon in Southern Leyte, in the Philippines.

History overview

From 1948-1973
The aftermath of World War II and consequently of the country's independence from the United States of America, created a zeal and enthusiasm among the people to improve their lives. Realizing that only through a well founded education could this goal be achieved, the families of the township of Macrohon were compelled to send their off springs into the neighboring township of Maasin for a secondary education. It is indeed the only alternative available to them at that time because there is no other place province wide that offers a post elementary education system. Maasin with its two established and prominent educational institutions provided this service.

However, the absence of an established road and transportation system  made the effort extremely difficult for the families. Their students must endure the heat of the sun and waist deep waters of major rivers and streams en route to Maasin every Sunday afternoon and on week's end as they all head home.

Understanding their plight, Mayor Rafael Diola Joven, who himself sends three of his offspring to Maasin, organized a collective effort with the aim of establishing a private high school system in the township of Macrohon. He patiently solicited the support of civic minded individuals from within and outside of the township.

With the joint effort of the citizenry of Macrohon as well as of the neighboring townships, Macrohon Institute Incorporated (MACI) was established on April 4, 1948. It officially opened its door for business in July 1948. The enrollment totaled to 325 students.

Since the commencement of its operations, Macrohon Institute consistently provided a high quality academic and extra curricular instruction. It received an accolade from the Bureau of Education in 1960–1962 in recognition of its achievements in the yearly National Senior High School Proficiency Examination. The school ranked on the upper quartile among all other secondary schools in the entire country. In the field of military training MACI won the annual PMT Tactical Inspection being conducted by the 38th PC Company in 1955-1956 and again in 1965–1966. At this point, MACI has been the 1st school recipient of the Governor Alfredo K. Bantug Military Trophy Award. The school proved itself by garnering several awards during annual district, provincial, regional, national academic, athletic and cultural competitions.

During its entire length of operation, Macrohon Institute produced high-grade professionals in all fields of specialty. Several individuals are currently holding high-ranking positions in both private and public institutions in the country and abroad.

Macrohon Institute celebrated its 25th anniversary in 1973. A whole week of competitive and colorful festivities marked the occasion. With the financial support of the administration as well as of the student body government, the school's factions namely the Rising Youth of our Country and the Defenders of our Nation competed evenly on academic, cultural and athletic events. The celebration indeed drew a deep interest from the public and alumni body as evidenced by a very high attendance. As a result, some events were moved into the town's public square.

The year 1973 was also marked by two major national curricular innovations. A memorandum from the Bureau of Education and Culture mandated the imposition of National College Entrance Examination for senior high school students. Due to its rigid academic training, Macrohon Institute was assured with a 98% passing rate. High ranking students were indeed able to hurdle additional admission requirements being imposed by top grade colleges and universities of the country. Philippine Military Training (PMT) for all secondary males, underwent a revision too. The course was renamed Citizen Army Training (CAT) required the participation of all senior students and exempting the lower year levels.

1988-2001
A bourgeoning public school system created a financial difficulty for Macrohon Institute. Some families decided to avail of this free education by sending their offsprings into the three public schools of the township which are located in barangays Ichon, Villa Jacinta and San Roque. The successful pavement of the national highway also exacerbated the situation. With its completion in 1988, the transportation system also achieved a tremendous improvement. More families are sending their students into the neighboring township of Maasin. As a result, the school's student population plummeted further.

With the ouster of the Marcoses on February 25, 1986, the country adopted a new constitution. The new constitution mandated an overhaul of the entire educational system. One of the provisions imposed an allocation of a substantial amount for the funding of private educational entities otherwise known as FAPE. Its introduction in 1988 successfully resuscitated MACI's failing financial capability. The school receives an annual grant from the national government amounting to 1.5 million Pesos. Eventually Macrohon Institute recovered from these losses as more families enrolled their students into the school system.

With a renewed sense of optimism and confidence for the future, Macrohon Institute proudly celebrated its 50th anniversary in April 1998. The school term which normally ends in the last week of March was moved into the last few days of April in order to accommodate the occasion.

However, due to the public's increasing allegations about the administrator's mismanagement, nepotism, absence of financial accounting, non-allocation of dividends for the stockholders, a dynastic form of succession involving the management structure, incompetence, ineptitude, and sexual exploitation victimizing some of the female students prompted the resignation of the officials of the governing council. A complete usurpation of the entire school system by the current administrator soon emerged. All of these created a climate of discontent and frustration among the heirs of the incorporators and stockholders who for 50 years have been denied of their right for a regular accounting of the school's financial gains and therefore of the expected dividends. Leonardo Yuzon Joven, the founder's first born along with the heirs of Lazaro Kuizon and Julia B. Ligtas, organized a collective and legal effort of reforming and reorganizing the enterprise. Their effort was paid off when they successfully obtained a court order for the expulsion of the current administration and of a comprehensive accounting and review of the school's resources. A general meeting of all heirs was then called. An interim governing council was created and a new set of elected officials immediately assumed their posts.

This transition period was marked with so much animosity between the new and the previous administration. Frequent episodes of intimidation and harassment involving the ousted school administrator, some police officers and barangay officials made the new administration's task of reorganization extremely difficult. One incident called for an arbitration between the hired laborers who were painting the main building and the previous school administrator who was accused of physically harassing them while at work. Furthermore, its FAPE has been funnelled into a newly established private high school which was founded by the ousted administration. Efforts to recover this valuable resource were futile due to reasons that are beyond comprehension. As a result, the school's faculty and staff remained underpaid thereby placing the organization in a dangerously precarious situation.

2001-present
The darkest period of the newly reorganized Macrohon Institute occurred in the early morning hours of June 1, 2001 when the township was awakened by a rapidly consuming fire involving the whole main building which houses the school's administration offices, library system, faculty room, armory, reception area, stock and utility room, the school's student exchange, two of its class rooms and science laboratories. None of its precious resources were saved. Macrohon Institute stood despondent, abandoned, drained and bankrupt. Even the school's treasury has been plundered. Only seven hundred pesos is left in the account. Worst of all, when the institution started its school year, only 38 students enrolled. All of them must endure a school system that is completely devoid of a sound learning experience. However, they are extremely lucky because of a group of dedicated, conscientious and loyal mentors who in spite of their own financial shortcomings unselfishly dedicated their time and attention equally into these interested learners.

Macrohon Institute didn't actually fall or stood alone during this catastrophic event. Its tragedy instead has generated a tremendous amount of sympathy. Financial and moral support poured in. In just a few months after the disastrous fire, the school was able to regain its stance. A repair of the existing classrooms soon followed and then was furnished with a state of the art furniture. Library and instructional materials arrived in crates from the United States of America. For the first time in its long history, Macrohon Institute enjoyed a wide variety of books and modern classroom equipment that other schools in the area can only dream about. A steady flow of contributions from generous individuals assured the school of a reliable and adequate pool of resources in order to meet its own needs.

The Securities and Exchange Commission issued MACI its long-awaited registration on September 2, 2002. Having been out of an operating permit since June 17, 1998 due to the intentional failure of the previous school administrator, the institution lifted itself off from that alleged illegal existence and faced its critics with a new ammunition. This jubilation intensified when Dr. Sol Matugas from the Department of Education and Culture released the school's certificate of recognition in April 2003. Cogniant about these latest triumphs, MACI can't help but celebrate and be optimistic about the future.

Realizing about this major turn around, the people of Macrohon as well as of the neighboring townships started to entrust again their off springs to Macrohon Institute. Currently the student population grew from a low of 38 to a high of 287 students as of June 2006.

Macrohon Institute finally received its long-awaited FAPE on August 1, 2005. The fund's release has lifted the school off from a lingering financial difficulty since its reorganization in 2000. The sum amounting to 200,000 Pesos provided a much needed relief to the institution that has been plagued with a chronic financial shortfall. Unexpectedly, its 2005 freshmen and sophomore year level FAPE was also released on October 24, 2005. The fund's release was a surprise since it was determined earlier that it will be officially handed over in January 2006.

On April 7, 2006, Macrohon Institute reluctantly handed over the amphitheater complex to the Sobrepenia family. This is in compliance to the agreement that was being entered upon by the institution with Cedric Sobrepenia who represented the family during its negotiations with the administration regarding the property's lease extension. The new lease agreement that was finalized in July 2003, allowed a transition period of 3 years. Through the benevolence of the Madrona and Handayan family, the institution was guaranteed of a space for the construction of a temporary school building while the  administration is trying to secure the entitlement of the school's main lot in order to clear the way for the construction of the proposed four-storey school building.

Macrohon Institute will always be a beacon for all individuals who thirst for knowledge. Its ideals and values will never waver with the passage of time. Time perhaps will change but not MACI for sure.

The future of the school is brighter today than yesterday. Altruistic, generous, loyal, dedicated, trustworthy and God fearing school officials and employees assured MACI of this entitlement. An effort to downsize the institution was orchestrated immediately after the tragic fire. This in return will assure the enterprise with a competitive edge against all other institutions by being able to effectively streamline its expenditure, manage its meager resources and allot most of these into its new priorities.

Campus life

The MACI students' supreme government (MACISGO) has been formed since the foundation of the school. Officers are elected on an annual basis every third Tuesday of June. If the election is not well decided, a run-off is immediately scheduled. Elected officers are sworn into office on the first Friday of July. This date also corresponds to the school's annual acquaintance party.

General notices are posted in the school's bulletin board. Periodic school meetings are announced on a regular basis. Letters are mailed to the students and parents at least a week before the scheduled gathering.

Periodic examinations are scheduled on a monthly basis. The student is required to pay at least 10% of the annual school  fee. During each examination, the student is required to present to the school teacher of the required test permit. Otherwise, he/she will be excluded.

Scholarship grants are awarded to honor students. A 100% tuition free scholarship is given to class valedictorians, 50% for class salutatorians and 25% for first honorable mention students.

Academic and extra curricular activities are encouraged in order to foster the individual student's growth and development. The school actively participates in the annual district, unit, provincial, and national academic, athletic and cultural competitions. The student who garners the highest award will receive a recognition from the school's administration/ faculty and staff in the form of a cash prize and an unspecified material.

The school's foundation day is celebrated every October 24 in recognition of the school's founding father, the late Mayor Rafael Diola Joven whose birth anniversary is also celebrated on that day.

MACI Day is celebrated every second week of February (movable). The school sponsors varied fund raising activities in order to generate material resources with the sole purpose of upgrading the school's facilities, equipment and supplies and in augmenting the monetary compensation of its faculty and staff. Student participation during the occasion is generated in the form of academic, athletic, and cultural competitions. The school's two factions namely The Rising Youth Of Our Country and The Defenders Of Our Nation compete evenly on academic, athletic and cultural events. The holiday culminates on a Sunday in the form of a school picnic in the school's beach ground and promenade.

The school encourages the students to participate actively in civic and religious services. The township's government and parish church enlists the school to provide the effort usually on its annual town fiesta, Independence Day and other designated holidays.

Tutorial sessions are scheduled each day for those students who don't perform well academically. The school enlists the services of the honor students to provide the effort.

The school has also recently constructed a promenade where visitors can appreciate the school's coral reefs, nearby beach and clear sea water.

Picnic huts, and swaying palms provide shelter and comfort during sunny, sultry, and hot hours of the day.

Factional organization
MACI has two competing factions, namely the Defenders of Our Nation and the Rising Youth of Our Country. The members of these factions are selected from first year and new students and no factional change is allowed (meaning, it will be your faction from first year to graduation).

References
History of MACI
The Founding Fathers
Anthology

External links
The Official Website of Macrohon Institute, Inc.
The MACI Inc. Alumni Website

High schools in the Philippines
Schools in Southern Leyte
Educational institutions established in 1948